Wounded Knee may refer to

Places
 Wounded Knee, South Dakota
 Wounded Knee National Historic Landmark, a U.S. National Historic Landmark site of the 1890 massacre
 Wounded Knee Creek

Historical events
 Wounded Knee incident of 1973
 Wounded Knee Massacre of 1890

Arts, entertainment, and media

Music 
 "Wounded Knee", a 1989 song on Nik Kershaw's The Works
 "Wounded Knee", a 1993 instrumental piece by Primus from the album Pork Soda
 "Wounded Knee", a  1997 song by Walela
 "Bury my Heart at Wounded Knee", a 1992 song by Buffy Sainte-Marie
 "We Were All Wounded at Wounded Knee", a 1973 song by the Native American rock band Redbone

Other arts, entertainment, and media
Bury My Heart at Wounded Knee, a 1970 book by Dee Brown, which chronicles events leading up to the Wounded Knee Massacre
Bury My Heart at Wounded Knee (film), a 2007 film adaptation of the Dee Brown book

See also
Wounded Knees, an American band